Luther Judson Glenn (November 26, 1818June 9, 1886) was a prominent Georgia lawyer, politician, Confederate officer during the American Civil War, and antebellum Mayor of Atlanta.

He attended the University of Georgia where he was a member of the Phi Kappa Literary Society and graduated in 1841.  He was married to Mildred Lewis Cobb, a younger sister of Generals Howell and Thomas Reade Rootes Cobb (Howell Cobb later served as Governor of Georgia). An attorney, Glenn represented Henry County in the state legislature as a Democrat before arriving in Atlanta in 1851. Six years later, he was elected mayor and served two consecutive one-year terms. He was the first mayor to appoint regular committees in council for the various functions of city governance: Fire, Streets, Finance, and so on.

In March 1861, the Southern states that had seceded from the Union appointed special commissioners to travel to those other slaveholding Southern states that had yet to secede. Glenn served as the Commissioner from Georgia to the Missouri Secession Convention, publicly reading Georgia's Articles of Secession and trying to persuade Missouri politicians to vote to join Georgia in seceding from the Union.

During the Civil War, he served first as the company commander of C Company, Cobb's Legion (Infantry), and subsequently as Lt. Colonel of Cobb's Legion. He finished the war as the commander of the Post of Atlanta. In that position, he surrendered the remaining Confederate  troops of Atlanta to Col. Beroth B. Eggleston of the 1st Ohio Cavalry on May 3, 1865.

He remained in Atlanta until his death and was buried in Oconee Hill Cemetery in Athens, Georgia.

Of his sons, Howell Cobb Glenn, a lawyer, died young in 1890 and John Thomas Glenn, also an attorney, served as Mayor of Atlanta from 1889 to 1891.

See also
List of signers of the Georgia Ordinance of Secession

References
History of the University of Georgia, Thomas Walter Reed,  Imprint:  Athens, Georgia : University of Georgia, ca. 1949 p.438
Glenn genealogy, derived from family records, Helen Glenn Court, 2009

Members of the Georgia House of Representatives
1818 births
1886 deaths
Mayors of Atlanta
Confederate States Army officers
University of Georgia alumni
People of Georgia (U.S. state) in the American Civil War
People from Henry County, Georgia
Signers of the Georgia Ordinance of Secession
19th-century American politicians